Tulipa praestans is a species of tulip native to the mountains of Tajikistan. Many well known cultivars have been formed from the original plant.

Description
It has 3 to 7 grey-green leaves that are downy and fringed with hairs (ciliate). It can have one flower (normally in the wild,) or it can produce multiple flowers per bulb, meaning it can have a pair of flowers or up to a maximum of five flowers per bulb. It blooms in April, with cup shaped flowers. The anthers are yellow or purple.

Taxonomy
The specific epithet praestans, refers to the Latin for 'remarkable',' pre - eminent , superior , excellent or distinguished'.

T. praestans was originally described and published by Carl Anton von Meyer in The Gardeners' Chronicle Series 3, Vol.33 on page 239 in 1903.

Distribution and habitat
It is native to temperate areas of Central Asia.

Range
It is found in Tajikistan, in the Pamir-Alay mountain system.

Habitat

Cultivars 

The following cultivars represent praestans in cultivation: 'Fuselier' always has 

 T. praestans Fuselier; grows up to 30cm tall, with grey-green, lance-shaped leaves and stems in mid spring, bearing between three to five, cup-shaped, brilliant red, or bright red flowers, that can measure to 12cm across. It has gained the Royal Horticultural Society's Award of Garden Merit. It is valued by gardeners for its low growth height and habit of producing many flowers per bulb. 'Fusilier' even has a sport, 'Unicum'. 

 T. praestans 'Unicum', with the leaves edged in cream.

 T. praestans 'Moondance', - has deep orange flowers which are relatively large and have pointy petals.

 T. praestans 'Zwanenburg' - Anna Pavord in her book The Tulip describes ‘Zwanenburg’ as having “.......particularly striking flowers of a rich, clear red, which open more widely than other varieties”. A taller variety at 35cm.

 T. praestans 'Shogun' - blooming in mid- to late spring, has single, cup-shaped, yellow-orange flowers, flushed red at the base.

 T. praestans 'Tubergen's Variety' - has two to five flowers generally with a basal yellow suffusion and is a good doer, persisting in light soils without annual lifting.

Toxicity
All parts may cause severe discomfort if ingested. Contact may cause a skin reaction.

References

Other sources    
 Christenhusz, M. J. M. et al. 2013. Tiptoe through the tulips – cultural history, molecular phylogenetics and classification of Tulipa (Liliaceae). Bot. * J. Linn. Soc. 172:319. Note: lists as Tulipa praestans H. B. May
 Czerepanov, S. K. 1995. Vascular plants of Russia and adjacent states (the former USSR) Cambridge University Press. Note: lists as Tulipa praestans Hoog
 Encke, F. et al. 1993. Zander: Handwörterbuch der Pflanzennamen, 14. Auflage Note: lists as Tulipa praestans Hoog
 Groth, D. 2005. pers. comm. Note: re. Brazilian common names
 Huxley, A., ed. 1992. The new Royal Horticultural Society dictionary of gardening Note: lists as Tulipa praestans Hoog
 Komarov, V. L. et al., eds. 1934-1964. Flora SSSR. Note: lists as Tulipa praestans Hoog
 Walters, S. M. et al., eds. 1986-2000. European garden flora. Note: lists as Tulipa praestans Hoog

praestans
Plants described in 1903
Flora of Tajikistan